Agios Vasileios is a village and a community of the Lagkadas municipality in Greece. Before the local government reform of 2011, it was part of the municipality of Koroneia, of which it was a municipal district. The 2011 census recorded 1,309 inhabitants in the village. The community of Agios Vasileios covers an area of 28.271 km2.

See also
 List of settlements in the Thessaloniki regional unit

References

Populated places in Thessaloniki (regional unit)